Krootuse  is a village in Kanepi Parish, Põlva County in southeastern Estonia.

Politician Heinrich Mark (1911–2004) was born in Krootuse.

References

 

Villages in Põlva County
Kreis Werro